Barbarism, barbarity, or barbarous  may refer to:

 Barbarism (linguistics), a non-standard word, expression, or pronunciation
 Hybrid words, formerly called "barbarisms"
 Any society construed as barbarian
 Barbarian invasions, a period of migrations within or into Europe in the middle of the first millennium AD

 Museum of Barbarism, a museum in Northern Cyprus

See also
 Barbary
 Berber (disambiguation)
 Barbary Coast
 Barbary Pirates
 Abuse (disambiguation)
 Barbarian (disambiguation)
 Barbarous name, a meaningless or seemingly meaningless word used in magic rituals
 Socialism or Barbarism, a 2001 book about globalism by István Mészáros
 Primitive Culture (book), 1871 book about "primitive" versus "civilised" societies
 War crime, an act that constitutes a serious violation of the law of war